Macaíba is a municipality in the state of Rio Grande do Norte in the Northeast region of Brazil.

Climate
Macaíba has a rather dry tropical savanna climate (Köppen As) with like most of the Nordeste coast a strong dry season from September to January. Although the area is substantially drier than Natal, in accordance with its location in the transition to the agreste further west, the climate is hot year round and humidity is generally high particularly in the rainy season.

See also
List of municipalities in Rio Grande do Norte

References

Municipalities in Rio Grande do Norte